Albrecht mortars or Albrecht Schwerer Minenwerfers  ('heavy mortar launchers') were a series of wooden heavy mortars used by the Imperial German Army during the First World War.

History 
Although the majority of combatants had heavy field artillery prior to the outbreak of the First World War, none had adequate numbers in service, nor had they foreseen the growing importance of heavy artillery once the Western Front stagnated and trench warfare set in.   

Besides land mines, machine guns and trenches, barbed wire was a persistent threat to attacking infantry.  Often barbed wire was used to channel attackers away from vulnerable areas of a defenders trenches and funnel attackers into predefined kill zones where overlapping fields of machine gun fire could be brought to bear.  Rows of barbed wire could also be used to delay attackers allowing defenders time to man their trenches and to hold attackers at a safe distance to allow defenders to call in defensive artillery fire. 

What was needed to overcome the deadlock and give attackers an advantage was light, portable, simple, and inexpensive heavy firepower.  A way to provide this was by designing a series of heavy trench mortars which could be brought to forward area trenches to launch heavy, short ranged preparatory bombardments to clear obstacles and neutralize enemy defenses.

Design 
The Albrecht mortars came in a number of lengths and diameters  each with their own projectiles.  They consisted of a muzzle loaded smooth bore barrel built from wooden staves and wound with galvanized wire for reinforcement.  The base of the mortar was a large wooden block and there was a crescent-shaped adjustable metal stand with a hand wheel to adjust elevation.

Ammunition 
The propellant and projectiles were loaded separately and the projectile was a simple metal can with a reinforced wooden base and a wooden lid with handle.  The projectile was filled with explosives and metal fragments.  Range  was controlled by a combination of varying elevation and amounts  of propellant.

Accuracy, velocity, and range were all considered to be poor. The early projectiles also had poor aerodynamics, so later projectiles became more conical in shape. Due to poor aerodynamics, the projectiles sometimes fell on their side instead of their noses so timed fuses were used instead of impact fuses. The slow-moving projectiles were given the nickname of "coal buckets" by the French.

Weapons of comparable role, era or performance 
 22.5 cm Minenwerfer M 15 - Austrian equivalent
 240 mm trench mortar - French equivalent
 9.45-inch heavy mortar - British equivalent

Photo gallery

References 

World War I artillery of Germany
World War I mortars of Germany
Mortars
250 mm artillery